The Dhi Qar governorate election of 2013 was held on 20 April 2013 alongside elections for all other governorates of Iraq outside Iraqi Kurdistan, Kirkuk, Anbar, and Nineveh.

Results 

|- style="background-color:#E9E9E9"
!align="left" colspan=2 valign=top|Party/Coalition!! Allied national parties !! Leader !!Seats !! Change !!Votes
|-
|bgcolor="#FF0000"|
|align=left|State of Law Coalition || ||align=left|Nouri Al-Maliki|| 10 || 3 || 176,861
|-
|bgcolor="#009933"|
|align=left|Citizens Alliance ||align=left| || align=left|Ammar al-Hakim|| 7 || 2 || 122,088
|-
|bgcolor="#000000"|
|align=left|Liberal Coalition|| ||align=left|Muqtada al-Sadr|| 7 || - || 81,338
|-
|
|align=left|Solidarity with Iraq || align=left| || align=left|Talib Qathem Abdul Karim Al Hassan || 3 || || 50,363
|-
|
|align=left|National Loyalty Bloc || align=left| || align=left|Habib Nour Mahdi Nehme || 3 || || 43,369
|-
|
|align=left|National Partnership Gathering || align=left| || align=left|Hamid naim Khudayr Abdullah || 2 || || 26,670
|-
|
|align=left|Civil Democratic Coalition || align=left| || align=left|Shahid Ahmad Hassan Mohamed || 1 || || 17,906
|-
|bgcolor="#098DCD"|
|align=left|Al Iraqia National and United Coalition || || align=left|Ayad Allawi || || || 6,855
|-
|
|align=left|Law Advocate Knights' Bloc || || || || || 5,698
|-
|bgcolor="#F6BE22"|
|align=left|Iraq’s Benevolence and Generosity List || || || || || 3,167
|-
|colspan=2 align=left| Total || || || 31 || 1 || 534,315
|-
|colspan=7 align=left|Sources: al-Sumaria - Dhi Qar Coalitions, ISW, IHEC

References 

2013 Iraqi governorate elections